Dzelzava Manor is a manor house in Dzelzava Parish, Madona Municipality in the Vidzeme region of Latvia. It was built in Baroque style and completed in 1767. Damaged by fire in 1905, it was fully restored to its original appearance in 1908 under the guidance of architect Vilhelms Bokslafs. The building currently houses the Dzelzava primary school.

See also
List of palaces and manor houses in Latvia

References

External links
  Dzelzava Manor
 

Manor houses in Latvia
Baroque architecture in Latvia
1767 establishments in the Russian Empire
Madona Municipality
Kreis Wenden
Vidzeme